Theodoor Herman "Theo" de Meester (16 December 1851 – 27 December 1919) was a Dutch politician of the defunct Liberal Union (LU) now merged into the People's Party for Freedom and Democracy (VVD) and economist. He served as Prime Minister of the Netherlands from 17 August 1905 until 12 February 1908.

De Meester was the son of Gerrit Abraham de Meester (1817–1864), who had been a member of the House of Representatives for the Zwolle constituency from 1862 to 1864. A former administrator in the Dutch East Indies, De Meester's cabinet was inaugurated on 17 August 1905. It consisted of five Liberal, two Free-minded Democratic, and two non-partisan ministers. It had no majority in either of the two Dutch chambers, and earned the nickname "Porcelain Cabinet". His government first resigned in December 1906, when the defence budget for 1907 was rejected by the Senate. That resignation was refused by Queen Wilhelmina, but the government fell in December 1907, when the Dutch parliament disapproved the defence budget for 1908. The government remained as a demissionary government until 12 February 1908.

References
 

 

1851 births
1919 deaths
Dutch accountants
Dutch atheists
Dutch expatriates in Indonesia
Dutch magazine editors
Dutch nonprofit directors
Dutch nonprofit executives
Dutch political writers
Former Calvinist and Reformed Christians
Liberal Union (Netherlands) politicians
Members of the Council of State (Netherlands)
Members of the House of Representatives (Netherlands)
Ministers of Finance of the Netherlands
Municipal councillors of The Hague
People from Den Helder
People from Harderwijk
Prime Ministers of the Netherlands
Utrecht University alumni
19th-century Dutch civil servants
19th-century Dutch economists
19th-century Dutch male writers
19th-century Dutch politicians
20th-century Dutch civil servants
20th-century Dutch economists
20th-century Dutch male writers
20th-century Dutch politicians
Treasurers-General